António Maria Baptista  (5 January 1866 – 6 June 1920) was a Portuguese military officer and politician.

When he was lieutenant, he fought in Portuguese Mozambique, during the wars of pacification against the Vátuas, led by Gungunhana. He was promoted to colonel in 1917. He fought the monarchist uprising of 1919, and was nominated Minister of War in the same year. He, then, distinguished himself during a series of violent strikes, and a year later was nominated and became President of the Ministry (Prime Minister), on 8 March 1920. He died suddenly while in office, after a Council of Ministers reunion, on 6 June 1920.

He was posthumously promoted to general and was decorated with the Grand Cross of the Order of the Tower and Sword.

References

1866 births
1920 deaths
People from Beja, Portugal
Democratic Party (Portugal) politicians
Prime Ministers of Portugal
Portuguese military officers
19th-century Portuguese people
Recipients of the Order of the Tower and Sword